Poacevirus is a genus of viruses, in the family Potyviridae. Poaceae plants serve as natural hosts. There are three species in this genus.

Taxonomy
The genus contains the following species:
 Caladenia virus A
 Sugarcane streak mosaic virus
 Triticum mosaic virus

Structure
Viruses in Poacevirus are non-enveloped, with flexuous and filamentous geometries. The diameter is around 12-15 nm, with a length of 680-750 nm. Genomes are linear and non-segmented, around 9.7-10.3kb in length.

Life cycle
Viral replication is cytoplasmic. Entry into the host cell is achieved by penetration into the host cell. Replication follows the positive stranded RNA virus replication model. Positive stranded RNA virus transcription is the method of transcription. The virus exits the host cell by tubule-guided viral movement.
Poaceae plants serve as the natural host. The virus is transmitted via a vector (wheat curl mite). Transmission routes are vector.

References

External links
 Viralzone: Poacevirus
 ICTV

Potyviridae
Virus genera